William Cripps (1 January 1805 – 11 May 1848) was a British Conservative Member of Parliament.

Early life
Cripps was born 1 January 1805 and baptised at Cirencester on 17 May 1805. He was the eldest son of Joseph Cripps, and, his second wife, Dorothea Harrison. His father served as MP for Cirencester. His brother, Henry William Cripps, QC, was the father of William Harrison Cripps, the prominent British surgeon, and politician Charles Cripps, 1st Baron Parmoor.

He matriculated at Trinity College, Oxford on 25 May 1822, aged seventeen. He received a B.A. in 1826 and M.A. in 1829.

Career
He was admitted to the Inner Temple and became a barrister-at-law in 1829.

He sat himself for the constituency of Cirencester, from 1841 until his death in 1848. From 1845 until 1846 he held minor office in Sir Robert Peel's government as a Junior Lord of the Treasury.

Personal life
On 29 January 1839, Cripps was married to Mary Anne Harrison (1805–1892) at Streatham Church, Surrey. Mary Anne was the eldest daughter Benjamin Harrison of Clapham Common. Together, they were the parents of:

 William Frederick Cripps (b. 1840), who was born at St James's Palace.
 Wilfred Joseph Cripps (1841–1903), who married Maria Harriet Arabella Daniel-Tyssen, sister of Charles Daniel-Tyssen, in 1870. After her death in 1881, he married Countess Helene von Bismarck-Schierstein, daughter of Count Friedrich von Bismarck and granddaughter of Sir Henry Williams-Wynn, in 1884.
 Catherine Dorothy Cripps (1842–1909)
 Edmund William Cripps (1843–1899), who married Ada Radcliffe, a daughter of Lt.Gen. Robert Parker Radcliffe.
 Walter Mainwaring Cripps (1844–1900).

Cripps died on 11 May 1848 and was buried in St. Catherine's Chapel within Cirencester Chrch on 18 May 1848. His will, dated 31 July 1840, was proved 30 August 1848.

References

External links 

 

1805 births
1848 deaths
Conservative Party (UK) MPs for English constituencies
UK MPs 1841–1847
UK MPs 1847–1852